Francon is a French surname. Notable people by that name include:

 Maurice Francon (1913–1996), French engineer and physicist.
 Mellie Francon (born 1982), Swiss snowboarder. 
 Robert Francon, French philatelist and signatory to the Roll of Distinguished Philatelists.
 Aeneas Francon Williams (1886–1971), Minister of the Church of Scotland.

French culture